Martín Dávila Gandara (born 12 May 1965) is a Mexican Catholic sedevacantist bishop. He is the bishop of the Sociedad Sacerdotal Trento (Priestly Society of Trent).

Biography

Early life 
Martín Dávila Gandara was born in a small town in Jalisco, Mexico, on 12 May 1965. He was born into a Catholic family. His parents are Don José del Refugio Avila and Maria Mercedes Gándara Lozano. He was baptized on 10 June 1965 in the Parish of Saint Louis Bishop, in the same town he was born, and was confirmed on 21 January 1966. His mother instilled in him a devotion to the Señor de los Rayos (Our Lord of the Rays).

In 1972, his family moved to Ciudad Juárez, Chihuahua. On solemn liturgical days, he traveled to hear Mass from the Church of Jesus and Mary in El Paso, Texas, United States, a church belonging to the Society of Saint Pius X (El Paso stands across the Mexico–United States border from Ciudad Juárez).

Dicaonate 
In December 1988, being a deacon, he was sent to Acapulco, Guerrero, to assist in Carmona's intense ministry and work.

Priesthood

In 1996, he moved for ten months to Acapulco, where he exhumed and transferred to the Divine Providence Church the body of Carmona (who died in 1991), which was previously buried some miles from the church. It is claimed that during the transference, Carmona's body showed no signs of decomposition, and that pictures taken of him when his body was put into the crypt looked the same at the time of his funeral.

Episcopacy

Bishop Mark Pivarunas of the Congregation of Mary Immaculate Queen (CMRI), who along with Bishop Daniel Dolan inherited the responsibilities of the care of numerous churches and thousands of sedevacantists throughout Mexico after Carmona's death, requested the priests of the Sociedad Sacerdotal Trento to elect one of their own to be consecrated a bishop. On 14 October 1998, the priests, by a two-thirds majority of their votes, elected Dávila to be consecrated a bishop. On 11 May 1999, Dávila was consecrated a bishop by Pivarunas and Dolan in the Temple of the Divine Providence.

October 2002, he received the Diploma from the Institute of Sciences and Higher Education, AC (Hermosillo, Sonora), Higher School of Philosophy that accredits him as a member of the first Generation (1998-2002) of the degree in philosophy.

On 16 February 2022, in Argentina, he consecrated Argentinian Catholic sedevacantist priest Father Pio Espina a bishop.

References

External links 

 Personal blog

1965 births
Living people
People from Jalisco
Mexican traditionalist Catholics
Sedevacantists
Thục line bishops